Gore is a township municipality in the Canadian province of Quebec, located within the Argenteuil Regional County Municipality. Its main community is Lakefield.

Geography
The terrain is characterized by forested mountains and numerous streams and lakes. Notable lakes include Barron, Hughes, Chevreuil, aux Oiseaux, Solar, Caroline, Evans, Dawson, Clark, Grace, Sugarloaf, Clair, and Carruthers; many of them have been entirely developed over the years, but there still remain many with little or no construction to date.

The majority of its territory is covered by old-growth forests with a wide variety of species both deciduous and coniferous, such as birch, poplar, sugar maple, beech, white pine, fir, spruce, hemlock, and cedar.

History
The Gore Township was established in 1840, named after Francis Gore (1769–1852), Lieutenant-Governor of Upper Canada from 1806 to 1811 and from 1815 to 1817. It was colonized by Scottish and Irish settlers, such as Robert Smith and James Stephenson.

In 1845, the Gore Municipality was formed, abolished two years later, and restored in 1855. In 1853 it had about 1000 inhabitants but this dropped to about 800 people ten years later, almost all of Irish origin. The Gore Post Office operated between 1898 and 1958.

Demographics 

Mother tongue (2021):
 English as first language: 17.8%
 French as first language: 76.8%
 English and French as first language: 2.2%
 Other as first language: 3.1%

Local government

Gore forms part of the federal electoral district of Argenteuil—La Petite-Nation and has been represented by Stéphane Lauzon of the Liberal Party since 2015. Provincially, Gore is part of the Argenteuil electoral district and is represented by Agnès Grondin of the Coalition Avenir Québec since 2018.

List of former mayors:
 Ron Kelley (1997–2005)
 Scott Pearce (2005–present)

Education
The Commission scolaire de la Rivière-du-Nord (CSRDN) operates Francophone public schools:
 École primaire Bellefeuille in Saint-Jérôme
 École secondaire Émilien-Frenette in Saint-Jérôme and École polyvalente Lavigne in Lachute

The Sir Wilfrid Laurier School Board operates English-language public schools:
 Laurentian Elementary School in Lachute
 Laurentian Regional High School in Lachute

See also
List of township municipalities in Quebec

References

Further reading

External links

Township municipalities in Quebec
Incorporated places in Laurentides
Greater Montreal